Bengalon is a town in the East Kalimantan province of Indonesia.

Transport 

It is the proposed port for the export of coal, brought in by a new heavy duty railway.

References

External links 

East Kutai Regency
Districts of East Kalimantan
Populated places in East Kalimantan